This article provides details of international beach soccer games played by the Russian national beach soccer team from past to present.

Results

2016

2017

2018

2019

References

Football in Russia
2020s in Russian sport